Let the World Know is the third studio album by Swedish metal band Dead by April. The album is the first without former vocalist Jimmie Strimell who had since been replaced by Christoffer Andersson, current member of What Tomorrow Brings. The album is also the last to feature original drummer Alexander Svenningson and clean vocalist Zandro Santiago, who both left in 2014. Three of the songs on the album, "As a Butterfly", "Beautiful Nightmare" and "Hold On", were re-recorded in 2019 with Jimmie Strimell and Pontus Hjelm on lead vocals and Marcus Rosell on drums.

History
The album was announced in posts of the band regarding their recording progress, dating back as early as October 2012, and was announced to have been completed in November 2013, making the album's approximate recording time 13 months. The track list and the album's cover were released on 9 December 2013 on the band's official Facebook page.

Track listing
All tracks are written by Pontus Hjelm.

Personnel
Dead by April
 Zandro Santiago – clean vocals
 Christoffer Andersson – unclean vocals
 Pontus Hjelm – guitars, keyboards, programming, backing vocals
 Alexander Svenningson – drums
 Marcus Wesslén – bass guitar

Charts

References

2014 albums
Dead by April albums